Los Beverly de Peralvillo is a 1971 Mexican comedy film directed by Fernando Cortés. The film is based on the television series of the same name.

Synopsis
El Borras marries La Pecas, unaware of her mother's (Doña Chole) scheme against Borras. That of Borras to provide for all her family members who are a lazy bunch composed of her father and brothers.

Cast
Guillermo Rivas as "El Borras"
Leonorilda Ochoa as "La Pecas"
Arturo Castro as "Bigotón"
Amparo Arozamena as Doña Chole "La Tarantula"

External links

Mexican comedy films
1971 films
1970s Mexican films